Living in the Present Future is the second studio album by Swedish rock singer-songwriter Eagle-Eye Cherry. It was released in 2000. Cherry worked with such producers as The Dust Brothers, John Kurzweg, and Rick Rubin.

Four songs from the album were released as singles: "Are You Still Having Fun?", "Long Way Around", "Promises Made" and "Feels So Right". The only single to experience success across multiple regions was "Are You Still Having Fun?", which reached the top 40 in France, Sweden, Switzerland and the United Kingdom. "Long Way Around" became a minor hit in a few countries, but the following two singles did not make a commercial impact.

Track listing
All songs written by Eagle-Eye Cherry. Co-writers credited as noted.
 "Been Here Once Before" – 3:48 (Cherry, Klas Åhlund)
 "Are You Still Having Fun?" – 3:11
 "One Good Reason" – 3:26 (Cherry, Christopher Watkins)
 "Promises Made" – 3:36 (Cherry, Watkins)
 "Burning Up" – 5:02
 "Together" – 5:30 (Cherry, Torrell)
 "Long Way Around" featuring Neneh Cherry – 3:28 (Cherry, Watkins)
 "Lonely Days (Miles Away)" – 3:59
 "First to Fall" – 3:57
 "Miss Fortune" – 3:47
 "She Didn't Believe" – 3:41 (Cherry, Watkins)
 "Shades of Gray" – 3:22 (Cherry, Watkins, Eric Schermerhorn)
 "Wishing It Was" – 4:17 (Cherry, John King, Mike Simpson, M. Nishita. Bonus track not on European version; also appeared on Santana's 1999 release, Supernatural)

2001 re-release
On 30 October 2001 the album was re-released with the title Present/Future. The new version replaced three new tracks, and with some tracks reordered.

All songs written by Eagle-Eye Cherry. Co-writers credited as noted.
 "Been Here Once Before" – 3:48 (Cherry, Klas Åhlund)
 "Are You Still Having Fun?" – 3:11
 "One Good Reason" – 3:26 (Cherry, Christopher Watkins)
 "Promises Made" – 3:36 (Cherry, Watkins)
 "Feels So Right" – 4:20 (Cherry, Watkins, Mattias Torrell)
 "Crashing Down" – 5:21 (Cherry, Watkins)
 "Long Way Around" featuring Neneh Cherry – 3:28 (Cherry, Watkins)
 "Lonely Days (Miles Away)" – 3:59
 "Together" – 5:30 (Cherry, Torrell)
 "Burning Up" – 5:02
 "Shades of Gray" – 3:22 (Cherry, Watkins, Eric Schermerhorn)
 "Never Let You Down" – 5:45 
 "Wishing It Was" – 4:17 (Cherry, John King, Mike Simpson, M. Nishita)

Personnel
Eagle-Eye Cherry - vocals, keyboards, piano
Mats Asplen - Fender Rhodes electric piano, organ, Moog synthesizer
Patrick Warren - Chamberlin
Klas Åhlund, Eric Schermerhorn, Mattias Torrell, Christopher Watkins - acoustic and electric guitars
Olav Gustaffson - pedal steel guitar
Spencer Campbell, Peter Fors, Benny Rietveld - bass guitar
Jim Bogios, Rodney Holmes, Magnus Persson - drums
Dominic Keyes, Karl Perazzo, Raul Rekow - percussion
Per "Texas" Johansson - saxophone
Goran Kajfes - trumpet
John Kurzweg - additional guitar

Charts

Weekly charts

Year-end charts

Certifications and sales

References

External links
 

Eagle-Eye Cherry albums
2000 albums
MCA Records albums
Albums produced by Rick Rubin